Anchor Township is located in McLean County, Illinois. As of the 2010 census, its population was 286 and it contained 139 housing units. Anchor Township formed from Cropsey Township in 1877. The township's name most likely is derived from the hymn "My Soul Is Anchored in the Cross".

Geography

Demographics

References

External links
City-data.com
Illinois State Archives

Townships in McLean County, Illinois
Populated places established in 1877
Townships in Illinois
1877 establishments in Illinois